The 2017 Marist Red Foxes football team represented Marist College in the 2017 NCAA Division I FCS football season. They were led by 26th-year head coach Jim Parady and played their home games at Tenney Stadium at Leonidoff Field. They were members of the Pioneer Football League. They finished the season 4–7, 3–5 in PFL play to finish in a tie for eighth place.

Schedule

Game summaries

at Bucknell

Stetson

at Georgetown

Jacksonville

at Davidson

Columbia

at Valparaiso

Drake

at Dayton

Morehead State

at San Diego

References

Marist
Marist Red Foxes football seasons
Marist Red Foxes football